"1, 2, 3, 4 (Sumpin' New)" is a song by American rapper Coolio. It was the third single released from his second studio album, Gangsta's Paradise (1995), in February 1996. Initially entitled "Sumpin' New", the song uses a sample from "Thighs High (Grip Your Hips and Move)", recorded in 1981 by American jazz trumpeter Tom Browne, and also includes a vocal sample from "Wikka Wrap" by the Evasions, from 1981. The song achieved success in several countries, including the United States, France, Iceland, and New Zealand, where it was a top-10 hit.

Critical reception
Larry Flick from Billboard described the song as "a jumpy, funk-lined jeep anthem that allows Coolio plenty of room to work up a fun, lyrical sweat." He added, "The sample-happy groove provides a wigglin' good time, riding primarily on a prominent snippet of the early '80s 12-incher "Wikka Wrap" by the Evasions. Lighter in content than Coolio's recent releases, this is a hit-bound jam that will leave you gleefully twitching and grinning from ear to ear." Gil L. Robertson IV from Cash Box picked "1, 2, 3, 4 (Sumpin' New)" as a "standout track" of the Gangsta's Paradise album. 

Ralph Tee from Music Weeks RM Dance Update rated the song four out of five. He remarked, "Unlike so many hip hop singles which lean towards often depressing issues, this is a spirited happy record about having a great party. It kicks off with a sample from The Evasions' 1981 novelty hit 'Wikka Wrap', the Alan Whicker impersonation leading towards an upbeat disco rap which utilises the much-used Chic bassline from 'Good Times' and some sampled Tom Browne horns. A strong third single from the hottest rapper in the biz right now." Another editor, James Hamilton described it as an "ultra infectious jiggly rap smacker".

Music video
A music video (directed by David Dobkin) for the Timber mix was released, featuring Coolio attempting to get to a party. Jamie Foxx and A. J. Johnson are also in the music video. A music video featuring the Muppets was released and premiered on the Disney Channel. This music video was also used as the closing number on the Muppets Tonight episode which guest-starred Coolio. The video won the MTV Video Music Award for Best Dance Video.

Video credits
 Coolio
 A. J. Johnson
 Jamie Foxx and guest stars
 Directed by David Dobkin
 Director of photography — unknown
 Editor — unknown

Track listings

 US 7-inch and cassette single, UK cassette single "1, 2, 3, 4 (Sumpin' New)" (Timber mix clean version) – 3:20
 "1, 2, 3, 4 (Sumpin' New)" (clean album version) – 3:20

 US, UK, and European CD single "1, 2, 3, 4 (Sumpin' New)" (Timber mix) – 3:20
 "Smilin'" – 4:09

 US 12-inch singleA1. "1, 2, 3, 4 (Sumpin' New)" (Timber mix extended version)
A2. "1, 2, 3, 4 (Sumpin' New)" (Timber mix instrumental)
A3. "1, 2, 3, 4 (Sumpin' New)" (Timber mix a cappella)
B1. "1, 2, 3, 4 (Sumpin' New)" (album version)
B2. "Kinda High, Kinda Drunk" (album version)

 UK 12-inch singleA1. "1, 2, 3, 4 (Sumpin' New)" (Timber mix extended version)
A2. "1, 2, 3, 4 (Sumpin' New)" (Timber mix instrumental)
B1. "1, 2, 3, 4 (Sumpin' New)" (album version)
B2. "Kinda High, Kinda Drunk" (album version)

 German CD single "1, 2, 3, 4 (Sumpin' New)" (Timber mix clean version) – 3:20
 "1, 2, 3, 4 (Sumpin' New)" (Timber mix extended version) – 4:33
 "1, 2, 3, 4 (Sumpin' New)" (Timber mix straight pass) – 3:31
 "Kinda High, Kinda Drunk" – 3:44

 Australian CD and cassette single "1, 2, 3, 4 (Sumpin' New)" (Timber mix)
 "1, 2, 3, 4 (Sumpin' New)" (clean album version)
 "1, 2, 3, 4 (Sumpin' New)" (Timber mix extended version)
 "1, 2, 3, 4 (Sumpin' New)" (Timber mix instrumental)
 "1, 2, 3, 4 (Sumpin' New)" (a cappella)
 "1, 2, 3, 4 (Sumpin' New)" (album version)
 "1, 2, 3, 4 (Sumpin' New)" (Timber mix straight pass)
 "Smilin'"

 Japanese CD single'
 "1, 2, 3, 4 (Sumpin' New)" (Timber mix)
 "Smilin'"
 "1, 2, 3, 4 (Sumpin' New)" (Timber mix instrumental)

Charts

Weekly charts

Year-end charts

Certifications

Release history

References

1995 songs
1996 singles
Coolio songs
Music videos directed by David Dobkin
Songs written by Coolio
Tommy Boy Records singles